Michelle Horn (born February 28, 1987)is an American actress. She is best known for her voice role as young Kiara in The Lion King II: Simba's Pride.

Career
Horn is known for her work in the television shows Strong Medicine and Family Law. Horn is also known for her voiceover work as young Kiara in The Lion King II: Simba's Pride. Her voice can be heard in Lion King-related merchandise such as software, plushes, toys and video games. Horn also costarred with Bruce Willis in the 2005 feature Hostage as Jennifer Smith and appeared on Loving Annabelle as Kristen and on Family Guy as Eliza Pinchley. She also guest starred in two episodes of Star Trek: Deep Space Nine, "Tears of the Prophets" and "Penumbra," as Sahgi, a young Bajoran resident of Deep Space Nine. She also guest starred in an episode of Without a Trace, "4.0" as Tara Patterson.

Filmography
 Strong Medicine Family Law The Lion King II: Simba's Pride (voice)
 Hostage Loving Annabelle The Coverup The Practice The Amanda Show Stuart Saves His Family Chance of a Lifetime Profiler The Journey of Allen Strange A Bug's Life The Ruby Princess Runs Away Lloyd in Space (voice)
 Fillmore! (voice)
 Family Guy (voice)
 Fillmore! (voice) 
 Star Trek: Deep Space Nine Without a Trace Little Athens Walt Disney World Quest: Magical Racing Tour (voice)

Personal life
In 2018, she married her husband Johnny Tsaur in a private ceremony at the Castle Green'' in Pasadena, California. They live in Culver City, California.

References

External links
 

1987 births
Living people
21st-century American actresses
Actresses from Pasadena, California
American child actresses
American film actresses
American television actresses
American voice actresses